Scribblenauts Unlimited is a puzzle sandbox video game developed by 5th Cell and published by Warner Bros. Interactive Entertainment for the Nintendo 3DS, Wii U, Microsoft Windows, iOS and Android. The game was announced during Nintendo's E3 2012 press conference on June 5. It is the fourth title in the Scribblenauts series, as a launch title for the Wii U console.

Gameplay

The gameplay in Scribblenauts Unlimited is largely similar to previous entries in the series. Maxwell returns as the player character and the objective is still to collect Starites by using objects the player creates to complete various tasks. Scribblenauts Unlimited is more adventure-based than Scribblenauts and Super Scribblenauts. One of the primary differences with this game is that it takes place in a large overworld that is open to exploration, as opposed to the first two games in the series, where the player had to choose an individual puzzle to earn Starites. Players can traverse different themed areas and accept challenges from NPCs. Sometimes, this will transport the player to a self-contained level, much like earlier Scribblenauts titles, where the player must solve multiple puzzles before being awarded with a Starite. There are now also smaller challenges within the world that reward the player with Starite shards - collecting ten of these shards is another way to earn Starites. There are also male and female versions of all NPCs (including animals) now, as well as new functions for the time and arcade machines. Due to the additional power of the Wii U, a budget meter is no longer present allowing up to 60 objects to be displayed at the same time.

The game was built on an upgraded version of the Objectnaut engine, providing the player with several additional options when creating objects. As well as the adjective system that was introduced in Super Scribblenauts, players can now attach multiple objects to each other; for example, creating a dog with wheels. Furthermore, there are numerous properties that can be assigned to objects, such as movement and offensive capabilities. Players can also customize their objects with scaling and coloring tools, similar to another 5th Cell franchise, Drawn to Life. Customized objects can be named and saved - typing in the name of a saved custom object allows it to be spawned at any time. According to game designer Jeremiah Slaczka, the Wii U version of the game can store more than 900 custom objects. The 3DS version lacks this object editor, due to technological constraints.

Version differences
The Nintendo 3DS version of Scribblenauts Unlimited does not feature the object editor heavily promoted in advertisements for the game. Instead, it features communications via the 3DS's StreetPass and SpotPass communication modes. In addition, the iOS and Android versions do not include an object editor.

The Wii U version of Scribblenauts Unlimited contains a local multiplayer mode, as well as online support that allows players to share and download each others’ creations custom-made in the object editor with the community. Each player can store up to 900 objects, whether made by the player or downloaded from the community. However, any player other than the first player in the local multiplayer mode of the game can not summon objects themselves. The Wii U version is the first game of the Scribblenauts series to be released on a home console. As a result, the game has been given a revamped high-definition visual style. The Wii U version also has exclusive cameo objects of characters and items from the Super Mario and Legend of Zelda games, which later returned in the European release of both Wii U and 3DS versions.

The Microsoft Windows version of Scribblenauts Unlimited is integrated with Steam Workshop to share custom objects within the community.

The iOS and Android versions feature revised touch controls suitable for multi-touch capacitive touchscreens, such as pinching to zoom in/out.

Original soundtrack
The music of Scribblenauts Unlimited was composed by David J. Franco. The game consists of 30 primary level tracks, only 28 of which appear in the game in their original composed form. The majority of tracks have two remixes that were created by Tracy W. Bush, one with an exaggerated bass line and new beat arrangements, and one with the primary drum tracks stripped out. In addition to these 50 remix tracks, there are three menu tracks, two tracks for special case objects, two musical scores for the intro/outro, and three unused tracks. This brings the grand total to 90 unique tracks produced for the game.

Below are the 28 original songs, listed based on the level in which they first appear. Some songs appear on multiple levels, and each level has a rotating set of three songs:
 "Title" aka Classroom
 "Edwin's Farm"
 "Capital City" aka Downtown
 "The Under Line" aka Subway
 "Punctuation Plaza"
 "Capital City Runoff" aka Ocean Deep
 "Hyphen Heights" aka Suburbia
 "Full Stop Diner" aka Restaurant
 "Metaforest" aka Woods
 "Grave Manor" aka Haunted House
 "The Virgule Gallery" aka Grotto
 "Sir Guillemet's Castle"
 "Ruins of Ellipsis" aka Rainforest
 "Anaphora Falls" aka River
 "Bullet Point Bayou" aka Swamp
 "The Listy Colon" aka Ocean
 "Payper Plains" aka Grasslands
 "Payper N. Penitentiary" aka Mine
 "Abian Sea Front" aka Waterfront
 "Pilcrow Peaks" aka Snowypeaks
 "Dusty Brush Canyon"
 "Abjad Dunes"
 "Camelcase Oasis"
 "Tomb of Onomatopoeia" aka Pyramid
 "Ampersand Beach"
 "Vowelcano"
 "Storybook Keep" 
 "Syntax Station"

Tracks that only appear as remixes
 "Underground" secondary tracks for Capital City and Payper N. Penitentiary
 "Temple" secondary tracks for Ruins Of Ellipsis and The Saurus Park

Other tracks
 "8Bit", "Time Past" - Special Case Objects
 "Game Over", "Object Editor", "Tally" aka The World Map - Menus
 "Pause", "Rumble", "Fast Travel" - Unused
 "5th Cell", "Starite Begin", "Starite Fail", "Starite Get!", "Starite Vision" - Jingles & Effects

Plot
Compared to previous Scribblenauts titles, Scribblenauts Unlimited has a more extensive backstory and reveals the regular protagonist Maxwell's reason for collecting Starites. In the opening scene, narrated by Lily (Jennifer Hale), Maxwell’s sister, the player learns that Maxwell's parents were travellers who later semi-retired and had 42 children. They gave Maxwell a magical notebook that can create any object by writing its respective word in it and Lily a magic globe that can be used to travel anywhere. Maxwell's parents show concern that he and Lily are becoming spoiled, however. One day, Maxwell comes across an old man who appears to be hungry. As a prank, Maxwell uses his notebook to create a rotten apple and gives it to the man. Angered, the old man scolds Maxwell for being spoiled and places a curse on Lily, causing her to slowly turn to stone. Maxwell brings Lily to their brother Edwin's farm. Edwin teaches Maxwell about "Starites" (which are gained by helping other people), which Maxwell must collect to free Lily from the curse. Maxwell vows to help as many people as he can and leaves the farm. After collecting Starites, Maxwell lifts the curse on Lily, and the old man is revealed to be Maxwell's father in disguise. He cast the curse on Lily to teach Maxwell to be a better person. Maxwell's father is forgiven, and all is well in the world again.

Reception

Scribblenauts Unlimited has received mixed reviews. IGN gave the Wii U version an 8.8 out of 10, praising its creativity and level progression, though noting its difficulty was low, and the Nintendo characters were limited. Nintendo World Report gave the Wii U version a 9 out of 10, praising its use of the GamePad, its engaging gameplay, and the new object editor. Destructoid Jim Sterling was less impressed, giving it a 5.0 out of 10, calling it limited, panning its simplicity and stating that "it's not actually worth it to be inventive".

In March 2013, the game was nominated for and won the Best Casual/Puzzle Game category of the Pocket Gamer Awards.

References

2012 video games
5th Cell games
Nintendo 3DS games
Nintendo 3DS eShop games
Nintendo Network games
Wii U games
Wii U eShop games
Windows games
IOS games
Android (operating system) games
Unlimited
Warner Bros. video games
Video games with Steam Workshop support
Action-adventure games
Puzzle video games
Video games developed in the United States
Open-world video games